Puthan Panam ( New money) is a 2017 Indian Malayalam-language crime thriller film written, directed and co-produced by Ranjith, based on the issue of black money and demonetisation. It stars Mammootty, Baiju, Mamukkoya, Hareesh Perumanna, Nirmal Palazhi and Swaraj Gramika in prominent roles.

The film follows the series of incidents that happened in Mangalore-based underworld don Nithyananda Shenoy (Mammootty)'s life, following the announcement of 2016 Indian banknote demonetisation on 8 November. Mammootty speaks Kasargode dialects in the movie. The film was released on 12 April 2017 two days before the Vishu holiday. The film was dubbed in Tamil as Cash back and Kannada as Demonetization.

Plot
Nithyananda Shenoy, an infamous gangster from Kumbala near Kasaragod takes revenge against an ex-minister who swindles him on the hours before sudden demonetisation is made known to public. In the sideline at the underbelly of Kochi survival story of Muthuvel and his mother Sundari is shown.

Cast

 Mammootty as Nityananda Shenoy
 Swaraj Gramika as Muthuvel
 Iniya as Sundari
 Mammukkoya as Awkku 
 Siddique as C.I Habeeb Rahman
 Sai Kumar as Ex-Minister Chandrabhanu
 P Balachandran as Adv.M.K Pillai
 Baiju as Neutral Kunjappan
 Joy Mathew as Mahin Haji
 Jennifer Antony as Saradha, Nithyananda Shenoy's Wife
 Sheelu Abraham as City Police Commissioner Sara Dominic
 Niranjana Anoop as Miya
 Suresh Krishna as Manager Ramanna
 Hareesh Perumanna as Chandru aka Chandrahassan
 Anil Murali as Adv.Shihab
 Arun as Artist
 Parvathy Nambiar as Artist
 Vishak Nair as Sunil
 Kottayam Nazeer as Nagaraj
 Vijayakumar as Jamshad 
 Ganapathi as Shine
 Abu Salim as Aravindan
 Kunchan as Bharathettan
 Indrans as Kuruvi (Marthandan)
 Sohan Seenulal as Sathyan
 Biju Pappan as Ganeshan
 Renji Panicker as Director General of Police/DGP, State Police Chief
 Nirmal Palazhi as Sharaf

Production

Development 
A film with Mammootty and Ranjith uniting was reported in April 2016. Ranjith later confirmed the news and said the title was not confirmed. In November, the title was revealed as Puthan Panam, with its subject reported to be of black money and a cast including Iniya, Renji Panicker, Sai Kumar and Siddique. A tagline, 'The New Indian Rupee', is suffixed to the title, coinciding with the situation when the ₹1000 and ₹500 banknotes were demonetised in India by the Central Government.

Filming 
Filming began on 25 November 2016. Filming took place in Cochin, Calicut, Goa and Pollachi. Mammootty plays Nithyananda Shenoy, a middle-aged man who hails from Kumbala and speaks Kasargode dialect. Mammootty was trained in Kasargode accent with the guidance of dialogue writer P. V. Shajikumar. Ranjith called Shajikumar for writing dialogues in Puthan Panam as per the suggestion of Mammootty. Mammootty found Kumar on a WhatsApp group named 'Njatuvela' where both were members. When Shajikumar translated a poem, "Apolitical Intellectuals" by Otto René Castillo, in Kasargode dialect and posted on the group, Mammootty was impressed. Shooting lasted three months. Swaraj Gramika, a child artiste from a Thiruvananthapuram-based theatre group, who played a prominent role in the film, was selected after a casual meet with Ranjith in Kozhikode, whom he had earlier sent the details of his two short films and theatre productions. Shaan Rahman composed the soundtrack.

Reception

Box office
The film got mixed to positive reviews from the critics. The film grossed ₹2.42 crore from first day of its release in Kerala box office. The film grossed ₹8.3 crore from 25 days in Kerala box office.

Critical Response
Deepa Soman of The Times of India rated the film three out five and concluded, "If you go expecting to watch a wholesome film on the black money issue, you might not get your money's worth from this flick. But if all that you care about is to stay entertained through the length of the film, it is worth your ‘Puthan Panam’".
Though appreciating Mammootty's characterisation saying, "You feel sorry for Mammootty, who plays his character with total dedication. He looks convincing and is his makeover is just brilliant," Moviebuzz of Sify stated, "Puthan Panam is lazily done and besides some casual references here and there, the connection with the demonetization drive is barely impressive. In short, after a good start, this one goes awry. Sad!"

References

2017 films
2010s Malayalam-language films
Films shot in Kochi
Films shot in Tamil Nadu
Films shot in Goa
Films shot in Kozhikode
Films shot in Pollachi
Films about organised crime in India
Fictional portrayals of the Kerala Police
Films scored by Shaan Rahman
Films directed by Ranjith